Stethomyia is a subgenus of the mosquito genus Anopheles. The type species is Anopheles nimbus. There are five species in this subgenus.

History
This genus was created by Frederick Wallace Edwards in 1932.

Phylogeny
Of the seven extant subgenera of Anopheles, Stethomyia appears to be the earliest diverging clade.

This branching order is currently under examination and may be revised.

Distribution
This subgenus is found in the Caribbean and both Central and South America.

Countries where species of this subgenus are found include: Bolivia, Brazil, Costa Rica, Colombia, French Guiana, Guyana, Panama, Peru, Suriname, Trinidad and Tobago and Venezuela.

The species in this subgenus are forest mosquitoes and to date have been poorly studied. Larvae and pupal forms have been found in shaded marshy and swampy areas along streams within forests. Adult females are known to feed on humans.

Description
Eggs:

Larvae:

 Widely separated seta 2-C
 The long pleural setae have thorn-like branches on one side only
 Abdominal setae 1 are vestigial or absent
 Anterolateral spiracular lobes have a narrow finger-like process
 Spiracles are prominent and widely spaced

Pupae:

Pupae do not seem to bear subgeneric characters.

Adults:

These species are all dark mosquitoes and lack pale scaling on the maxillary palpi, wings or legs found in other species.

They have a median longitudinal silvery stripe on the scutum and lack prealar setae.

Male genitalia gonocoxites have an internal seta and a single long parabasal seta that is not borne on a tubercle.

Medical importance
None of the species in this genus transmit malaria.

References

Anopheles
Insect subgenera